Early parliamentary elections were held in Northern Cyprus on 20 February 2005, after the coalition government led by Mehmet Ali Talat lost its majority in the House of Representatives. The vote was a resounding victory for Mehmet Ali Talat's CTP-United Forces alliance, although it fell just short of a majority. The UBP, Democratic Party and BDH also crossed the 5% election threshold and won seats in the House.

Electoral system
The House had 50 members, elected for a five-year term by mitigated proportional representation. Under North Cyprus law, a party had to receive 5% of the total vote to get any seats in parliament.

Results

Aftermath
Talat became Prime Minister, leading a coalition of the CTP and DP.

June 2006 by-election
A by-election was held on 25 June 2006 to fill the positions left vacant by the death of Salih Miroğlu (UBP general secretary) and  the election of Talat as president. The two parliamentary seats in contention were in Lefkoşa and Kyrenia. This by-election was held together with municipal elections, and the United States Department of State reported that both "were generally free and fair". Of the two vacant seats, one was held by the National Unity Party, the other by the CTP. The two elected candidates were Gülboy Beydağlı and Özkan Yorgancıoğlu, both of which belong to the CTP. The latter thus increased its representation in the Assembly from 24 to 25 seats. The ruling coalition of the CTP and DP had difficulty forming a government after this by-election. When three deputies (two from the National Unity Party and one from the Democratic Party) resigned to form the new, progovernment Freedom and Reform Party in September, the coalition collapsed and Serdar Denktaş quit the government. The CTP then formed a coalition government with the newly formed Freedom and Reform Party, in which it was the biggest partner, holding seven ministries.

References

Northern Cyprus
Elections in Northern Cyprus
2005 in Northern Cyprus
2000s in Cypriot politics
February 2005 events in Europe